Robert L. Turner (September 15, 1926 – April 1962) was an American baseball center fielder in the Negro leagues. He played with the Newark Eagles in 1944.

References

External links
 and Seamheads

1926 births
1962 deaths
Baseball players from New Jersey
Baseball outfielders
Newark Eagles players
People from Franklin, New Jersey
Sportspeople from Sussex County, New Jersey
20th-century African-American sportspeople